Hoseynabad (also Romanized as Ḩoseynābād; also known as ’oseynābād) is a village in Shirkuh Rural District, in the Central District of Taft County, Yazd Province, Iran. At the 2006 census, its population was 17, in 9 families.

References 

Populated places in Taft County